Landro is a village in Øygarden municipality in Vestland county, Norway.  The village is located on the northern part of the island of Sotra.  It lies about half way between the villages of Ågotnes and Sollsvika.  Landro Church is located in this village, serving the northern part of the island.

References

Villages in Vestland
Øygarden